

Events

Works published
the troubadour Englés and an anonymous jongleur compose a tenso debating the merits of the court of Theobald I of Navarre

Births
 Amir Khusro (died 1325), Sufi, writing in Persian and Hindustani

Deaths
 Fujiwara Toshinari no Musume died 1252 or 1253 (born 1171), Japanese poet
 Ahmad al-Tifashi (born 1184), Arabic poet, writer, and anthologist, in Tunisia
 Theobald I of Navarre (born 1201), a French trouvère

13th-century poetry
Poetry